Pantiya is a village near the town Anjar, the taluka of Kutch district in the Indian state of Gujarat.
This village is adopted by IFFCO Kandla.

Village is located 10 km from nearest town Anjar. Villagers enjoy very good drinking water supply,
and electricity supply with very less power shortages.
Village has good amount Telephone penetration, and nearly most of the houses has televisions and Cable supply.
Village Entrance greets welcome gate.

See also
 Nagalpar
 Sinugra 
 Pantiya 
 Khedoi
 Lovariya
 Chandiya
 Chandroda
 Mindiyana
 Shinai
 Adipur
 Gandhidham
 Healthcare in India
 Primary Health Centre

Cities and towns in Kutch district